"Without You" is a song by Korean Japanese pop singer-songwriter Jyongri. It was released on August 4, 2010 as her ninth single. It is Jyongri's first CD single in one year, since the release of "Muteki na Ai" in August 2009. "Without You" was the Fuji TV drama Asu no Hikari wo Tsukame. The song was released as a ringtone on July 5, as was "Story" on July 18. "Without You" debuted at number 88 on the Japanese Oricon chart and charted for two weeks.

Track listing

Charts

Release history

References 

2010 singles
Japanese-language songs
2010 songs
EMI Music Japan singles